is a former Japanese football player.

Playing career
Hisao Mita played for J3 League club; YSCC Yokohama in 2014.

References

External links

1991 births
Living people
Toyo University alumni
Association football people from Tochigi Prefecture
Japanese footballers
J3 League players
YSCC Yokohama players
Association football midfielders